The 2006 Spanish motorcycle Grand Prix was the first race of the 2006 Motorcycle Grand Prix season. It took place on the weekend of  24–26 March 2006 at the Jerez circuit.

MotoGP classification

250 cc classification

125 cc classification

Championship standings after the race (motoGP)

Below are the standings for the top five riders and constructors after round one has concluded.

Riders' Championship standings

Constructors' Championship standings

 Note: Only the top five positions are included for both sets of standings.

References

Spanish motorcycle Grand Prix
Spain
Motorcycle Grand Prix